Kongsted is a Danish DJ and music producer. He has won award for "Best DJ for Dance Mainstream" for both 2010 and 2011.

Discography

Albums

Singles and EPs

References

External links
Facebook

Danish DJs
Danish record producers
Living people
Electronic dance music DJs
Year of birth missing (living people)